The Regenkreis, with Straubing and later Regensburg as its capital, existed between 1806 and 1837 as one of the 15 districts of the Kingdom of Bavaria. Between 1806 and 1808, the Kingdom of Bavaria was divided into 15 (state) districts named after rivers. In English, Regenkreis means “District of Regen” and was named after the Regen River which flowed through the district. Regenkreis was the predecessor of the Regierungsbezirks Oberpfalz (Administrative Regional District of Upper Palatinate).

Independent cities

 Amberg (from 1810)
 Regensburg (from 1810)
 Straubing

Subdivisions
The district was divided in the following judicial districts (Landgerichte = LG), according to the original borders of the districts of the former territories (Herrschaftsgerichte = HG):

 Abensberg
 Amberg (from 1810)
 Barbing (briefly 1811)
 Burglengenfeld
 Cham
 Hemau
 Kastl (from 1810)
 Kelheim
 Kötzting
 Laberweinting HG (from 1814)
 Mitterfels
 Nabburg (from 1810)
 Neunburg vorm Wald (from 1810)
 Parsberg
 Pfaffenberg
 Regenstauf (from 1811)
 Riedenburg (from 1810)
 Roding (from 1814)
 Stadtamhof
 Straubing (until 1810)
 Sulzbach (from 1810)
 Viechtach
 Vohenstrauß (from 1810)
 Waldmünchen (from 1810)
 Wetterfeld
 Winklarn HG (from 1814)
 Wörth (an der Donau) LG (1811-1814, then HG)
 Zaitzkofen HG (from 1813)

History
In the years between 1806 and 1808 the Kingdom of Bavaria was divided in 15 (state) districts, whose names were taken from their rivers.  The Regenkreis was initially composed of 13 rural divisions and, since 1809, of the independent city of Straubing. In 1810 it was greatly enlarged to include the Principality of Regensburg.  Thereafter Regensburg was the headquarters of the District Commissioners-General (Generalkreiskommissariats). But the Regenkreis also gave areas to the Unterdonaukreis. At the request of King Ludwig I, the Territorial Reorganization (Gebietsreform) of 29 November 1837 was made by changing the name of the Regenkreis to the “Kreis Oberpfalz und Regensburg” [District of the Upper Palatinate and Regensburg], now “Oberpfalz”.

Literature
 (de) Handbuch der bayerischen Ämter, Gemeinden und Gerichte 1799 - 1980 [Guide of the Bavarian Districts, Municipalities and Courts 1799 - 1980], written by Richard Bauer, Reinhard Heydenreuter, Gerhard Heyl, Emma Mages, Max Piendl, August Scherl, Bernhard Zittel and edited by Wilhelm Volkert, Senior Professor at the University of Regensburg, Munich, 1983, 

Kingdom of Bavaria